This article covers the non-directionally labeled numbered east–west streets in the New York City borough of Brooklyn between and including 1st Street and 101st Street. Most are offset by about 40 degrees from true east–west, that is they run southeast–northwest, but by local convention they are called east–west.

With avenues numbered from 1 to 28, they form a street grid. While similar to Manhattan's grid, this Brooklyn grid does not have strict rules of traffic direction based on whether a street number is odd or even. This grid starts with 1st Street in Park Slope south of Garfield Place and ends with 101st Street just north of Shore Road and the Belt Parkway in Bay Ridge.

A separate grid of "West" and "East" streets (West 1st through West 37th Streets, and East 1st through East 108th Streets) lies on both sides of Dahill Road and run approximately north–south. A third grid on Bath Beach neighborhood specifies "Bay Streets" (facing Gravesend Bay), numbered from Bay 7th to Bay 50th Streets, with the first three streets having been taken over by Dyker Beach Park, and alternating with the numbered avenues from Bensonhurst and New Utrecht.

Streets

Main grid (Carroll Gardens to Bay Ridge)

East/West Grid (Southern and Eastern Brooklyn)

Bay Streets (Bath Beach/Gravesend Bay)

See also
List of Brooklyn thoroughfares
List of lettered Brooklyn avenues

 
Brooklyn
Brooklyn